In enzymology, an iron—cytochrome-c reductase (created 1972 as , transferred 2014 to ) is an enzyme that catalyzes the chemical reaction

ferrocytochrome c + Fe3+  ferricytochrome c + Fe2+

Thus, the two substrates of this enzyme are ferrocytochrome c and Fe3+, whereas its two products are ferricytochrome c and Fe2+.

Classification 

This enzyme belongs to the family of oxidoreductases, specifically those acting on a heme group of donors with other acceptors.

Nomenclature 

The systematic name of this enzyme class is ferrocytochrome-c:Fe3+ oxidoreductase. This enzyme is also called iron-cytochrome c reductase.

Structure and function 

This enzyme is part of the electron transport system of Ferrobacillus ferrooxidans. It employs one cofactor, iron.

References

 

EC 1.9.98
Iron enzymes
Enzymes of unknown structure